Siggi Mueller, (born Siegfried Müller on 12 October 1964) is a German film composer, photographer, keyboardist, pianist, and accordion player. Mueller has composed music for numerous German films and television productions.

Biography
Mueller began his career as a classical piano player at the Ulm theatre, in Germany. Today, the scope of his musical projects extends from classical music up to live performances in funk, soul, and rock. He is a full member of the German Film Academy. In recent years, he has extended his professional activities into the area of photography, especially in the field of portrait and cultural event photography.

External links
 
 Official website

German film score composers
Male film score composers
German male composers
1964 births
Living people